The Casa de Correos y Telegrafos (Post and Telegraphs office) is the central post office of the city of Lima, Peru. The building is located in the Historic center of Lima near the Plaza Mayor. The building was constructed in 1897 in a French architectural style. Additionally, the building houses the National Postal and Philatelic Museum. Besides displaying exhibits relating to postal service, the museum showcases exhibits relating to Limean history. The building is located along Piura street and its interior is lined with shops. Its facade contains a clock, and a bronze lion depicted with its snout open and devouring correspondence. The building occupies an area of 6,537 square meters.

References

Government buildings completed in 1897
Buildings and structures in Lima
Neoclassical architecture in Peru
Museums in Lima
Peru
Postal system of Peru
Peru
Cultural heritage of Peru